The ''Untitled Album'' Tour was a concert tour by American rock band Blink-182 in support of the group's untitled fifth studio album (2003). The arena and amphitheater began December 2, 2003 in Toronto and concluded December 16, 2004 in Dublin, Ireland. Support acts over the course of the tour included The Nervous Return, Motion City Soundtrack, Brand New, Gyroscope, Cypress Hill, Taking Back Sunday, Fall Out Boy, the Used, and Sparta. It was the band's final tour before their first "indefinite hiatus"/breakup.

Shows
Note: The band's co-headlining tour with No Doubt is not counted here.

References

Notes

Citations

External links
 

2003 concert tours
2004 concert tours
Blink-182 concert tours